Siamese Dream is the second studio album by American alternative rock band the Smashing Pumpkins, released on July 27, 1993, on Virgin Records. Despite recording sessions fraught with difficulties and tensions, Siamese Dream debuted at number ten on the Billboard charts, and eventually was certified 4× Platinum, with the album selling over six million copies worldwide, cementing the Smashing Pumpkins as an important group in alternative music. 

Four singles were released in support of Siamese Dream: "Cherub Rock", "Today", "Disarm", and "Rocket". The album has received widespread acclaim from critics and audiences alike, with the album's musical influences and lyrical material standing out compared to other releases during the alternative rock and grunge movements of its time. The album has since been considered "one of the finest alternative rock albums", and is widely regarded as one of the greatest albums of the 1990s and of all time. Rolling Stone magazine has ranked it between numbers 341 - 362 on various versions of their 500 Greatest Albums of All Time list.

Background 

The band's debut album, Gish, was released on Caroline Records in 1991 to unexpected success and acclaim. After the release of Nirvana's Nevermind later that year, the Smashing Pumpkins were hyped as "the next Nirvana". The band was signed to Caroline Records parent Virgin Records and began recording a follow-up album. Frontman Billy Corgan felt "this great pressure to make the next album to set the world on fire". The immense pressure to succeed intensified an already problematic situation: drummer Jimmy Chamberlin was addicted to heroin, guitarist James Iha and bassist D'arcy Wretzky had recently ended their romantic relationship, and Corgan, aside from battles with weight gain and suicidal depression, was struggling with writer's block.

Recording and production 

Siamese Dream was recorded mainly between December 1992 and March 1993. The band relocated to Triclops Studios in Marietta, Georgia for the album sessions, so they could avoid local friends and distractions, and to cut Chamberlin off from his known drug connections. Butch Vig reprised his role as producer after working on their debut album Gish. Butch Vig stated "Billy [Corgan] and I raised the bar really high. We wanted to make a very ambitious sounding record. It was all done on analogue tape so it was time consuming. We were working 12 hours a day, six times a week for about three months, and for the last two months we worked seven days a week, 14 or 15 hours a day because we were behind schedule."

After he suffered a nervous breakdown, Corgan began visiting a therapist. Consequently, his lyrics became more explicit about his troubled past and his insecurities. "Today" was one of the first songs written by Corgan for Siamese Dream. He played the self-recorded demo to Vig, and received a positive reaction. Soon afterward, executives from Virgin Records came to observe the band after hearing about their problems, but were pleased with the demo and did not soon return to the studio. The reaction from the executives only served to put more stress on Corgan. Corgan worked overtime, practically living in the studio for the recording of Siamese Dream—he and Vig would sometimes work on a 45-second section of music for two days, working 16-hour days for weeks at a time to achieve the sound Corgan wanted.

Corgan's desire for musical perfection put further strain on the already-frayed relationships between the band members. Vig later recalled, "D'arcy would lock herself in the bathroom, James wouldn't say anything, or Billy would lock himself in the control room". Corgan often overdubbed Iha's and Wretzky's parts with his own playing. Wretzky stated that Corgan only performed most of the guitar and bass parts because he could lay them down more easily in recording  and with far fewer takes. Stories of the album's recording had circulated in the music press. Corgan admitted there was some truth to accusations of tyrannical behavior, though he felt the press misunderstood the situation.

While Chamberlin performed all drum parts on the album, he would disappear for days on drug benders that caused everyone to fear for his life. After one incident where the drummer had disappeared for two or three days, Corgan "put the hammer down", according to Vig, and had Chamberlin perform the drum part for "Cherub Rock" until his hands bled. Due to Corgan's urging, Chamberlin checked into a rehab clinic. Corgan told Spin later that year, "You know, I gave them a year and a half to prepare for this record... I'm surrounded by these people who I care about very much, yet they continue to keep failing me." Corgan explained that he began to take the actions of others personally; he said, "If you really think about it, of course, someone doesn't do the job because they're lazy, or they don't think it's important. But I took it as, 'You're not worth going home and working on the song.'"

Meanwhile, Corgan was also going through his own problems. He would admit in 2011 that throughout the recording process he had been planning his own suicide. Stating that he had gotten rid of most of his things and was "fantasizing about my own death, I started thinking what my funeral would be like and what music would be played."

Virgin began to grow impatient with the album's recording as it went over budget and became behind schedule. The band, however, would not let the company cut corners if it meant compromising the sound. By the time recording was completed, Corgan and Vig felt too emotionally exhausted to mix the record. Corgan suggested that engineer Alan Moulder mix the album, due to his work on Loveless by My Bloody Valentine. Moulder booked two weeks in a studio to mix the album; the mix ended up taking 36 days to complete. Eventually, the album was finished after four months and $250,000 over budget.

Composition and lyrics 

The album boasts relatively high production values and ornate arrangements compared to other early-1990s alternative albums. Vig said, "Billy wanted to make a record that people would put on and say, 'What the fuck was that?' [...] We wanted to have things going on in the left ear and right ear all the time". One of Corgan's main goals was to create a sense of sonic depth, but, as Corgan said, "without necessarily using delays or reverbs—to use tonalities instead." For the album, the guitars were layered multiple times. Corgan has stated that "Soma" alone contains up to 40 overdubbed guitar parts. Vig stated that as many as 100 guitar parts were compressed into a single song.

The album, generally considered alternative rock, has many different musical influences, including shoegazing, dream pop, and heavy metal, with Rolling Stone noting that the album was "closer to progressive rock than to punk or grunge."

The subjects of Corgan's lyrics on Siamese Dream varied. Corgan noted that most of his lyrics for the album were about his girlfriend and future ex-wife Chris Fabian, with whom he had briefly broken up at the time he wrote the songs. Corgan occasionally wrote about other subjects. In "Cherub Rock", the album's opening track, Corgan attacked the American music industry, and "Today" is about a day that he was experiencing depression and suicidal thoughts.  "Spaceboy" was written as a tribute to his autistic half-brother, Jesse.

Artwork and packaging 

The artwork for the album was initially going to be created by an outsider artist, but after a series of disagreements with the label, Corgan was forced to step in at the last minute. The album booklet, composed of old photographs of both strangers and Corgan's family members with lyrics handwritten on top, was assembled by Corgan and his wife the day after their wedding. Corgan was not satisfied with the results. The first pressing of the CD contained a 20-page booklet, with a separate page devoted to each song's lyrics and accompanying photograph; later pressings contained a four-panel fold-out liner with thumbnails of each picture. In 1999, Virgin Records reissued the album with the original 20-page booklet.

Shortly after the Pumpkins reformed in 2007, Corgan posted a message to the band's blog saying that they were "[l]ooking for girls from Siamese Dream album cover... As you all know, they were quite young when the photo was taken. They are not conjoined anymore, as far as we know." The band's intentions for the search were never made clear. In February 2011, Billy Corgan announced via Twitter that not only had one of the girls been found, she was the current bassist for the Pumpkins, Nicole Fiorentino. According to Corgan, "Just found out the weirdest news: our bass player Nicole just admitted she is one of the girls on the cover of Siamese Dream." However, according to the assistant photographer for Siamese Dream, the cover photo was probably shot specifically for the album. Given Fiorentino's age at the time of the album, this would make her too old to be on the cover of the album. It was later confirmed that the information was false, and both girls were located in 2008, though Corgan has not commented on this. Pictures exist of Corgan standing with Ali Laenger, the girl on the right side of the photograph, but it is unknown if the girl on the left, identified as LySandra Roberts, met Corgan like Laenger did.

The album was also released as a shaped wooden box set (aka Siamese Dream Collectors Edition) with metal hinges, limited to only 1,000 copies and containing the UK HUT CD album housed in a recess with individually numbered silver metal embossed plate at the side and a 20-page booklet housed in a similar recess in the lid. Though the CD itself and the booklet are official and genuine, the wooden box is not an official Virgin (US) or HUT (UK) release.

Release, reception and legacy 

Siamese Dream was released on July 27, 1993, and debuted at number ten on the Billboard 200 the following week. The album was almost universally lauded by music critics. Selects Andrew Perry praised it as "the most grand-scale, expansively-passionate blasts of music you'll hear this year" and remarked that it would be "hard for anyone to top this one". John Harris of NME wrote that Siamese Dream, "for all its air of non-committal blankness and exercise-book psychoanalysis, is a startling, deeply satisfying record". Steve Hochman of the Los Angeles Times predicted that "the scale of its success will likely be tied to how many fans are willing to stop moshing and enter into some rather contemplative, even tender territory", and wrote that "the songs tend to drift in places, and some get a bit long-winded, but the overall balance between the harsh and the sweet makes for a strong and distinctive package". Lorraine Ali of Rolling Stone called the album "a strong, multidimensional extension of Gish that confirms that Smashing Pumpkins are neither sellouts nor one-offs."

Entertainment Weekly critic David Browne praised the band for living up to industry expectations of being the "next Nirvana" and compared Siamese Dream favorably to Nirvana's Nevermind, concluding: "In aiming for more than just another alternative guitar record, Smashing Pumpkins may have stumbled upon a whole new stance: slackers with a vision." Critic Simon Reynolds disagreed; he wrote in his review for The New York Times that "fuzzed-up riffs and angst-wracked vocals are quite the norm these days, and Smashing Pumpkins lacks the zeitgeist-defining edge that made Nirvana's breakthrough so thrilling and resonant." Robert Christgau of The Village Voice cited "Geek U.S.A." and "Today" as highlights while noting the record's strength is "the sonics"; he later rated the album with a three-star honorable mention. Siamese Dream earned the Smashing Pumpkins their first Grammy Award nominations. The album was nominated for the Grammy Award for Best Alternative Music Performance, and the group was nominated for Best Hard Rock Performance with Vocal at the 36th Annual Grammy Awards.

Siamese Dream continues to receive critical praise and has been frequently included in lists of the best albums of the 1990s—the Alternative Press ranked it fourth, Pitchfork ranked it 18th, and Spin ranked it 23rd. In 2003, the album was ranked number 360 on Rolling Stones list of 500 Greatest Albums of All Time, with the album's ranking dropping to number 362 and rising to number 341 in the 2012 and 2020 updates of the list, respectively. In a retrospective review of the album, Greg Prato of AllMusic called Siamese Dream "one of the finest alt-rock albums of all time" and remarked that it "stands alongside Nevermind and Superunknown as one of the decade's finest (and most influential) rock albums." Chicago Tribune critic Greg Kot wrote that it "became a soundtrack for a significant portion of [Corgan's] generation" and "did so by tempering some of the first album's extremes; sticky melodies and pretty production can make almost anything radio-friendly, even a desperately sad song like 'Today.'" In a review for Pitchfork, Ned Raggett remarked that while initial reviews of the album singled out Corgan's lyrics for criticism, they were actually "exactly what made the band click even further", commending Corgan's "ear for hooks, metaphors, and deft summaries." The deluxe edition of the album holds a score of 96 out of 100 on review aggregate site Metacritic, indicating "universal acclaim". In April 2019, Rolling Stone ranked Siamese Dream as the twelfth greatest Grunge album of all time. The album was also included in the book 1001 Albums You Must Hear Before You Die.

Track listing

Reissue bonus material

Personnel 
The Smashing Pumpkins

 Billy Corgan – lead vocals, guitars, bass guitar, Mellotron on "Spaceboy", string arrangements, production, mixing
 James Iha – guitars, backing vocals
 D'arcy Wretzky – bass guitar, backing vocals
 Jimmy Chamberlin – drums

Additional personnel

 Mike Mills – piano on "Soma"
 Eric Remschneider – string arrangements and cello on "Disarm" and "Luna"
 David Ragsdale – string arrangements and violin on "Disarm" and "Luna"

Technical staff

 Butch Vig – production, engineering, mixing, string arrangements
 Jeff Tomei – engineering
 Tim Holbrook – special technical engineering
 Alan Moulder – mixing
 Howie Weinberg – mastering
 Len Peltier – sleeve art direction
 Steve J. Gerdes – sleeve design
 Melodie McDaniel – sleeve photography
 Bob Ludwig – mastering (2011 remaster)

Charts

Weekly charts

Year-end charts

Certifications

References

External links 
 Siamese Dream at AllMusic
 Siamese Dream at Discogs
 Siamese Dream at Cool Album of the Day
 Siamese Dream accolades

1993 albums
Albums produced by Billy Corgan
Albums produced by Butch Vig
The Smashing Pumpkins albums
Virgin Records albums
Grunge albums
Alternative metal albums by American artists
Indie rock albums by American artists
Psychedelic rock albums by American artists